Osamah Alshanqiti is a Saudi Arabian athlete who competes in triple jump and high jump.

He represented Saudi Arabia at the 2008 Summer Paralympics in Beijing, and won his country's first ever Olympic or Paralympic gold medal, with a world record jump of 15.37 metres in the F12 triple jump event.

Notes

Living people
Paralympic athletes of Saudi Arabia
Athletes (track and field) at the 2008 Summer Paralympics
Paralympic gold medalists for Saudi Arabia
Saudi Arabian people with disabilities
Saudi Arabian male triple jumpers
Saudi Arabian male long jumpers
Track and field athletes with disabilities
Paralympic silver medalists for Saudi Arabia
Year of birth missing (living people)
Medalists at the 2008 Summer Paralympics
Paralympic medalists in athletics (track and field)